4035 Thestor, provisional designation: 1986 WD, is a large Jupiter trojan from the Greek camp, approximately  in diameter. It was discovered on 22 November 1986, by Japanese astronomers Kenzo Suzuki and Takeshi Urata at the Toyota Observatory  in Toyota, Japan. The assumed C-type asteroid belongs to the 50 largest Jupiter trojans and has a rotation period of 13.5 hours. Of more than half a million numbered minor planets, it has been the second-lowest numbered body without a name, until May 2021, when it was named after Thestor, a grandson of Apollo from Greek mythology.

Classification and orbit 

Thestor is a dark Jovian asteroid orbiting in the leading Greek camp at Jupiter's  Lagrangian point, 60° ahead of the Gas Giant's orbit in a 1:1 resonance (see Trojans in astronomy). It is also a non-family asteroid in the Jovian background population.

It orbits the Sun at a distance of 5.0–5.6 AU once every 12 years and 2 months (4,438 days; semi-major axis of 5.28 AU). Its orbit has an eccentricity of 0.06 and an inclination of 12° with respect to the ecliptic.

Numbering and naming 

This minor planet was numbered by the Minor Planet Center on 22 March 1989. On 14 May 2021, the object was named by the Working Group Small Body Nomenclature (WGSBN), after Thestor from Greek mythology, who was a grandson of Apollo and the father of Calchas.

Before Thestor was named, it belonged to a small group of only 8 unnamed minor planets with a designated number smaller than 5000. (All of them are Jupiter trojans or near-Earth asteroids). Since then, several have already been named:

 3708 Socus  – named in May 2021
 4035 Thestor   – named in May 2021
 4489 Dracius  – named in May 2021
 
 
 4715 Medesicaste  – named in May 2021
 4835 Asaeus

Physical characteristics 

Thestor is an assumed, carbonaceous C-type asteroid, which is in line with the body's albedo (see below), while its V–I color index of 0.93 agrees with that of most Jovian D-type asteroids.

Rotation period 

In October 2009, a rotational lightcurve was obtained from photometric observations by astronomer Stefano Mottola at the Calar Alto Observatory in Spain. It gave a well-defined rotation period of  hours with a brightness variation of 0.21 in magnitude, superseding a period of 13.52 hours and an amplitude of more than 0.20 previously measured with the ESO 1-metre telescope at La Silla Observatory in May 1991.

In August 2015, photometric observations of Thestor by the Kepler space observatory during its K2 mission gave a concurring period of 13.475 and 13.49 hours with a brightness amplitude of 0.18 and 0.17 magnitude observations.

Diameter and albedo 

According to the surveys carried out by the Infrared Astronomical Satellite IRAS, the Japanese Akari satellite, and the NEOWISE mission of NASA's Wide-field Infrared Survey Explorer, the asteroid measures between 66.99 and 68.73 kilometers in diameter and its surface has an albedo between 0.054 and 0.076. The Collaborative Asteroid Lightcurve Link derives an albedo of 0.0548 and a diameter of 68.23 kilometers based on an absolute magnitude of 9.6.

References

External links 
 Asteroid Lightcurve Database (LCDB), query form (info )
 Discovery Circumstances: Numbered Minor Planets (1)-(5000) – Minor Planet Center
 
 

004035
Discoveries by Kenzo Suzuki (astronomer)
Discoveries by Takeshi Urata
Named minor planets
19861122